John Mark Reppion (born 1978) is an English comics writer. He is married to Leah Moore, the daughter of Alan Moore, and he has worked with both on the comic Albion.

John Reppion and Leah Moore have co-writing credits on Wild Girl, a 6-part comic for Wildstorm with art by Shawn McManus and J.H. Williams III. Since 2003 the majority of his comics work has been co-written with Leah, as Moore & Reppion. Together they have scripted comics and graphic novels for the likes of 2000 AD, Channel 4 Education, Dark Horse, DC Comics, Dynamite Entertainment, Electricomics, IDW, and Self Made Hero.

Moore & Reppion were consulting writers for some of the mysteries featured in Frogwares Games multi-platform adventure Sherlock Holmes: Crimes & Punishments, 2014.

In 2008 The History Press published 800 Years of Haunted Liverpool – John's weird history/paranormal guidebook to the city. 

He has written articles for the likes of Fortean Times, the History UK website, the Crime + Investigation UK website, Darklore, and Kerrang! magazine, and is a contributing editor for The Daily Grail online.

His fiction has been published in anthologies from Combustion Books, Ghostwoods Books, PS Publishing, Snowbooks, Swan River Press, and Vagrants Among Ruins.

Bibliography

Comics

Wild Girl (with co-author Leah Moore, and art by Shawn McManus and J.H. Williams III, Wildstorm, 2006)
Albion (plotted by Alan Moore, with co-author Leah Moore, and art by Shane Oakley, Wildstorm, 2006, tpb, Wildstorm, 176 pages, December 2006, Titan Books, 144 pages, January 2007)
Accent Anthologies (with co-author Leah Moore):
 "Lusca" (with David Hitchcock, in Monsters, 2006)
 "An Molethy a an Ny-marrow (The Curse of the Un-dead)" (with David Hitchcock, in Zombies, 2007)
 "The Cabinet of Doctor Diablo" (with Andy Bloor, in Robots, 2008)
 "Mrs. Henry" (with David Hitchcock, Western, 2009, forthcoming)
Witchblade: "Shades of Gray" (with co-author Leah Moore, and art by Stephen Segovia, Top Cow/Dynamite Entertainment, 2007)
Raise the Dead (with co-author Leah Moore, and pencil by Hugo Petrus and inks by Marc Rueda, 4-issue mini-series, Dynamite Entertainment, 2007, tpb, 120 pages, February 2008)
Savage Tales: "Battle for Atlantis" (with co-author Leah Moore, and art by Pablo Marcos, in Savage Tales #1–3, Dynamite Entertainment, 2007)
Gene Simmons House of Horrors: "Into The Woods"  (with co-author Leah Moore, and art by Jeff Zornow, IDW Publishing, 2007, tpb, 192 pages, April 2008)
Space Doubles: "Project: Obeah" (with co-author Leah Moore, and art by Jeremy Dale and Jason Roth, Th3rd World Studios, 2007)
Nevermore: "The Black Cat" (with co-author Leah Moore, and art by James Fletcher, Eye Classics, Self Made Hero, October 2007)
 "Deadeye" (with co-author Leah Moore and art by Matt Timson, in Popgun No. 1, Popgun No. 2, Image Comics, 2007/2008)
Darkness vs. Eva (with co-author Leah Moore and art by Edgar Salazar)
Doctor Who: "The Whispering Gallery" (with co-author Leah Moore and art by Ben Templesmith, one-shot, IDW Publishing)
The Complete Dracula (with co-author Leah Moore and art by Colton Worley, 5-issue limited series, Dynamite Entertainment 2009)
The Trial of Sherlock Holmes (with co-author Leah Moore, Dynamite Entertainment 2009)
 The Thrill Electric with co-author Leah Moore and art by WindFlower Studio, October 2011, forthcoming
Sherlock Holmes – The Liverpool Demon (with co-author Leah Moore), Dynamite Entertainment, forthcoming

Articles

 "The Childe of Hale" (Fortean Times No. 187, September 2004)
 "Suspension of Disbelief: The Great Yarmouth Bridge Disaster of 1845" (The Anomalist No. 13, 2007)

Books

 800 Years of Haunted Liverpool (with illustrations by Mo Ali, Declan Shalvey and others, The History Press, 2008)
 Spirits of Place (editor, Daily Grail Publishing, 2016)
 Sir Gawain and the Green Knight (graphic novel adaptation, illustrated by Mark Penman, self-published Moore/Reppion, 2021)

Notes

References

External links
Official homepage

Interviews

July 2006 interview about Albion and future projects, by Forbidden Planet
2006 FractalMatter interview

1978 births
Living people
British comics writers
Writers from Liverpool
English male writers
People from Hunt's Cross